Edimar Silva Jacomelli or simply Edimar (born April 22, 1987 in Florestópolis-PR), is a Brazilian right back. He currently plays for Ferroviária-SP on loan from Atlético-PR.

Made professional debut for Atlético-PR in 1-0 home win against Portuguesa-PR in Campeonato Paranaense on January 24, 2007.

Contract
Ferroviária-SP 1 January 2008 to 30 May 2008
Atlético-PR 1 August 2006 to 1 August 2010

References

External links
 rubronegro
 atleticopr
 CBF

1987 births
Living people
Brazilian footballers
Club Athletico Paranaense players
Esporte Clube Noroeste players
Associação Ferroviária de Esportes players
Association football defenders